Lovisa is a Swedified form of Louise, which originates in Louis and has been used in Sweden since the 17th century. It was placed in the Swedish calendar in the 1750s after king Adolf Fredericks marriage to Lovisa Ulrika of Prussia in 1744. Lovisa means fighter. 

The name Lovisa had a rejuvenation in the 1980s and 90's in Sweden but has since then begun to decline. 

Lovisa is placed in the Swedish calendar (namnsdag) on August 25.

Famous people with the name Lovisa
Royalty
 Lovisa of Sweden, Queen of Denmark
 Lovisa Ulrika of Prussia, Queen of Sweden
Artists
 Lovisa Augusti, opera singer, member of the Swedish Royal Academy of Music
 Brigitte Lovisa Fouché, artist
 Greta Lovisa Gustafsson (aka Greta Garbo), actress
Other famous people
 Lovisa Åhrberg, doctor and surgeon
 Lovisa von Burghausen, Swedish prisoner of war, known for her life as a slave in Russia
 Sofia Lovisa Gråå, educator and principal
 Agatha Lovisa de la Myle (died 1787), Baltic-German and Latvian poet
 Lovisa Svensson (1853-1963), 109-year-old.

Places
 Loviisa

References 

Feminine given names
Swedish feminine given names